Karen Lisa Finerman (born February 25, 1965) is an American businesswoman and television personality.

Early life and education
Finerman was born to a Jewish family, the daughter of Jane and Gerald Finerman. She was raised in Beverly Hills, California with sisters Wendy, Leslie, and Stacey, and a brother, Mark. Finerman graduated from Beverly Hills High School in 1983. In 1987, she graduated from the Wharton School of Business at the University of Pennsylvania.

Career
Co-founder of Metropolitan Capital Advisors, Inc., Finerman is also President of the firm.

She is a board member of the Michael J. Fox Foundation for Parkinson's Research and trustee of the Montefiore Medical Center. She is a member of the board of GrafTech International, Ltd.

Finerman is a panelist on the show Fast Money on CNBC.

She is a founding Master Player of the Portfolios with Purpose contest.

Her first book, Finerman's Rules: Secrets I'd Only Tell My Daughters About Business and Life was published by Hachette Book Group's Business Plus on June 4, 2013.

Personal life
Finerman has four children (two sets of twins) and is married to Lawrence E. Golub, who manages Golub Capital, a credit asset manager.

References

Further reading

External links
 

 

American broadcast news analysts
Living people
Wharton School of the University of Pennsylvania alumni
CNBC people
People from Beverly Hills, California
Jewish American journalists
Journalists from California
1965 births
21st-century American Jews